Connor Gleeson is a Gaelic footballer who plays for Dunmore MacHales and the Galway county team. His usual position is as a goalkeeper.

He saved a Conor McManus penalty in Pádraic Joyce's first game as manager.

He played association football as a goalkeeper for Galway United in the League of Ireland until 2015.

Honours
Galway
 Connacht Senior Football Championship: 2022

References

Year of birth missing (living people)
Living people
Association footballers from County Galway
Association football goalkeepers
Gaelic footballers who switched code
Gaelic football goalkeepers
Galway inter-county Gaelic footballers
Galway United F.C. players
League of Ireland players
Republic of Ireland association footballers